William L. Zana (born 1966) is a United States Army major general from the Army National Guard who served as the commanding general of Combined Joint Task Force - Horn of Africa from May 15, 2020 to May 14, 2022. He previously served as Deputy Director for J-5 Politico-Military Affairs (Africa) on the Joint Staff and, as a brigadier general, led CJTF-HOA from May to June 2018.

Dates of rank

References

Living people
1966 births
Date of birth missing (living people)
Park University alumni
Marine Corps University alumni
National Defense University alumni
United States Army generals